Krnica is a village in southeastern Istria, Croatia.

Description
Krnica is situated 195 meters (639 feet) above sea level. Just 2.3 km (1.4 mi) southeast from Krnica there is a port named Krnički porat which is still one of the protected Istrian areas with very few houses and beautiful nature all around it. Krnica and the other villages around it are very popular places for tourists because they are very close to the sea and are perfect for biking, swimming, diving, boat rides. Krnica is a very peaceful village and even during the summers, there are no traffic jams.

Sv. Roko (Rokova) is a cultural event which is organised once a year, on August 16, and attracts usually around 500 people. The village has a post office, a store, and a pizza restaurant. The church and its bell tower are located in the middle of the village.

Geography
It is located about 17 km (10.5 mi) northeast of the largest city in Istria County, Pula. The population is 286 (as of the 2011 census).

References

Populated coastal places in Croatia
Populated places in Istria County